Cranbury is an unincorporated community and census-designated place (CDP) located within Cranbury Township, in Middlesex County, New Jersey, United States.  As of the 2010 United States Census, the CDP's population was 2,181. Despite the similarity in the name of Cranbury Township and the CDP, the two are not one and the same, as had been the case for most paired Township / CDP combinations prior to the 2010 Census, in which the CDP was coextensive with a township of the same name.

Geography
According to the United States Census Bureau, the CDP had a total area of 1.218 square miles (3.156 km2), including 1.199 square miles (3.106 km2) of land and 0.019 square miles (0.050 km2) of water (1.57%).

Demographics

Census 2010

Census 2000
As of the 2000 United States Census there were 2,008 people, 703 households, and 534 families living in the CDP. The population density was 625.2/km2 (1,621.6/mi2). There were 728 housing units at an average density of 226.7/km2 (587.9/mi2). The racial makeup of the CDP was 88.35% White, 1.89% African American, 8.12% Asian, 0.20% from other races, and 1.44% from two or more races. Hispanic or Latino of any race were 1.49% of the population.

There were 703 households, out of which 45.7% had children under the age of 18 living with them, 69.4% were married couples living together, 5.0% had a female householder with no husband present, and 23.9% were non-families. 20.3% of all households were made up of individuals, and 10.2% had someone living alone who was 65 years of age or older. The average household size was 2.79 and the average family size was 3.27.

In the CDP the population was spread out, with 30.9% under the age of 18, 2.4% from 18 to 24, 30.1% from 25 to 44, 23.3% from 45 to 64, and 13.2% who were 65 years of age or older. The median age was 39 years. For every 100 females, there were 91.2 males. For every 100 females age 18 and over, there were 86.2 males.

The median income for a household in the CDP was $104,444, and the median income for a family was $129,877. Males had a median income of $95,316 versus $44,500 for females. The per capita income for the CDP was $51,095. About 1.1% of families and 2.2% of the population were below the poverty line, including 4.0% of those under age 18 and 1.4% of those age 65 or over.

References

External links
 Official Township Web Site
 Lions Club Sponsored Web Site

Census-designated places in Middlesex County, New Jersey
Cranbury, New Jersey